Darreh Zhan may refer to:

Darreh Zhan-e Bala
Darreh Zhan-e Pain